Mary, Crown Princess of Denmark, Countess of Monpezat,  (Mary Elizabeth; née Donaldson; born 5 February 1972) is the wife of Frederik, Crown Prince of Denmark. Frederik is the heir apparent to the throne, which means that should he succeed, Mary will automatically become Queen consort of Denmark.

The couple met at the Slip Inn, a pub in Sydney when the prince was visiting Australia during the 2000 Summer Olympics. Their official engagement in 2003 and their marriage the following year was the subject of extensive attention from Australian and European news media, which portrayed the marriage as a modern "fairytale" romance between a prince and a commoner.

Since her marriage, the Crown Princess has carried out engagements on behalf of her mother-in-law the Queen and currently serves as patron of over 30 charitable organisations, including the United Nations Population Fund, the European regional office of the World Health Organization, the Danish Refugee Council and Julemærkefonden. She founded her award-winning social organisation the Mary Foundation in 2007. In 2019, she was made a rigsforstander which allows her to act as regent when the Queen and Crown Prince Frederik are abroad, due to her eldest son Prince Christian, having not yet reached adulthood.

Early life
Mary Elizabeth Donaldson was born 5 February 1972 at Queen Alexandra Hospital in Battery Point, Hobart. She is youngest of four children to Scottish parents, Henrietta (née Horne), an executive assistant to the vice-chancellor of the University of Tasmania, and Prof. John Dalgleish Donaldson, an academic and mathematics professor. Her paternal grandfather was Captain Peter Donaldson (1911–1978). She was named after her grandmothers, Mary Dalgleish and Elizabeth Gibson Melrose, and was born and raised in Hobart, Australia. She has two older sisters, Jane Stephens and Patricia Bailey, and an older brother, John Stuart Donaldson. Her mother died from complications following heart surgery on 20 November 1997 when Mary was 25. In 2001, her father married the British author and novelist Susan Moody (née Horwood).

During her childhood, she was involved in sports and other extracurricular activities both at school and elsewhere. She studied music, playing piano, flute, and clarinet, also playing basketball and hockey.

Education
In 1974, Donaldson started schooling in Clear Lake City Elementary School in Houston, Texas, (where her father was working) and moved to Sandy Bay, Tasmania, from 1975 to 1977. Her primary education, from 1978 to 1983, was at Waimea Heights with her secondary schooling (1984–1987) being at Taroona High School, and matriculation (1988–1989) at Hobart College. She studied at the University of Tasmania from 1990 to 1994, graduating with a combined Bachelor of Commerce and Bachelor of Laws degree on 27 May 1995. Between 1994 and 1996, she attended a graduate program and qualified with certificates in advertising from the Advertising Federation of Australia (AFA) and direct marketing from the Australian Direct Marketing Association (ADMA).

Her native language is English, and she studied French during her secondary education. In 2002, she briefly worked as an English tutor in Paris while dating Crown Prince Frederik. After moving to Denmark and prior to her marriage, Donaldson studied Danish as a foreign language at Studieskolen in Copenhagen in 2003.

Career
She worked for Australian and global advertising agencies after graduating in 1995. Upon graduation she moved to Melbourne to work in advertising. She became a trainee in marketing and communications with the Melbourne office of DDB Needham, taking a position of account executive. In 1996, she was employed by Mojo Partners as an account manager. In 1998, six months after her mother's death, she resigned and travelled to America and Europe. In Edinburgh, she worked for three months as an account manager with Rapp Collins Worldwide; then, in early 1999, she was appointed as an account director with the international advertising agency Young & Rubicam in Sydney.

In June 2000, she moved to a smaller Australian agency, Love Branding, working for a short time as the company's first account director. However, in the (Australian) spring of 2000 until December 2001, she became sales director and a member of the management team of Belle Property, a real estate firm specialising in luxury property. In the first half of 2002 Donaldson taught English at a business school in Paris but, on moving to Denmark permanently, she was employed by Microsoft Business Solutions (5 September 2002 – 24 September 2003) near Copenhagen as a project consultant for business development, communications and marketing.

Personal life

Courtship and engagement
Mary met Crown Prince Frederik of Denmark at the Slip Inn on 16 September 2000 during the 2000 Summer Olympics in Sydney. Frederik was at the bar with his brother Prince Joachim, his cousin Prince Nikolaos of Greece and Denmark as well as the then Prince of Asturias and Princess Märtha Louise of Norway. The Prince of Asturias knew Mary's flatmate. Frederik was not identified by her friends as the Crown Prince of Denmark until after they met. They conducted a long-distance relationship and Frederik made a number of discreet visits to Australia. On 15 November 2001, the Danish weekly magazine Billed Bladet named Mary as Frederik's girlfriend. She then moved from Australia to Denmark in December 2001, while she was working as an English tutor in Paris.

On 24 September 2003, the Danish court announced that Queen Margrethe II intended to give her consent to the marriage at the State Council meeting scheduled for 8 October 2003. Frederik had presented Mary with an engagement ring featuring an emerald-cut diamond and two emerald-cut ruby baguettes, which are similar to the colour of Denmark's flag. The couple became officially engaged on 8 October 2003.

Marriage and children

Donaldson and Frederik married on 14 May 2004 in Copenhagen Cathedral, in Copenhagen. The couple reportedly spent their honeymoon in Africa.

The couple have four children:
Prince Christian Valdemar Henri John, born 15 October 2005 at Rigshospitalet in Copenhagen 
Princess Isabella Henrietta Ingrid Margrethe, born 21 April 2007 at Rigshospitalet in Copenhagen 
Prince Vincent Frederik Minik Alexander, born 8 January 2011 at Rigshospitalet in Copenhagen 
Princess Josephine Sophia Ivalo Mathilda, born 8 January 2011 at Rigshospitalet in Copenhagen

The Danish Folketing (parliament) passed a special law (Mary's Law) giving Donaldson Danish citizenship upon her marriage, a standard procedure for new foreign members of the royal family. She was previously a dual citizen of Australia and the United Kingdom. Formerly a Presbyterian, she converted to the Evangelical Lutheran Church of Denmark upon marriage.

As a native English speaker, Mary's main priority from the time of her engagement was to become fluent in the Danish language, and acknowledged that this was a challenge for her in several interviews at the time of her engagement and marriage. However, after months of intensive lessons to learn Danish, Crown Princess Mary succeeded very well in mastering the language.

Mary and her family currently reside at Frederik VIII's Palace, one of the four palaces that make up the Amalienborg Palace complex. From May 2004, they have also resided at the Chancellery House, a building in the park at Fredensborg Palace, during the summer months.

Mary is an avid equestrian and has competed at several dressage events.

Among others, Mary is the godmother of Princess Estelle of Sweden, who was also given the secondary name Mary in her honour, as well as her nephew, Prince Henrik of Denmark.

Public life, charities and patronages

Following the wedding, the Crown Prince couple embarked upon a summer working-tour of mainland Denmark aboard the royal yacht Dannebrog, then travelled to Greenland and later to the 2004 Athens Olympics. In 2005, during the celebrations for the 200th anniversary of Hans Christian Andersen, the royal family was involved in related events throughout the year. Frederik and Mary marked the anniversary in London, New York and in Australia, where she was made Honorary Hans Christian Andersen Ambassador to Australia in the Utzon Room of the Sydney Opera House.

Since becoming Crown Princess, Mary has made a number of international visits, and Frederik and Mary participated in the reburial ceremonies for Empress Maria Feodorovna in Denmark and Saint Petersburg in 2005. In November 2009, Mary made a surprise visit to Danish soldiers in Helmand Province, Afghanistan. One of her stops was FOB Armadillo.

During a Council of State on 2 October 2019, the Queen's request to appoint Mary a rigsforstander, a functioning regent when the monarch or the heir is out of the country, was approved by the government. After having sworn to respect the Danish constitution, she became the first person not born into the royal family to assume the position of rigsforstander since Queen Ingrid in 1972.

Mary was voted Woman of the Year 2008 by a Danish magazine, Alt for damerne, donating her cash reward to charity. She was interviewed by Parade Magazine, (US) on television programs of Andrew Denton (Australia) and USA Today (US).

She would be the first Australian-born queen consort in Europe upon the ascension of her husband.

Patronages and interests
Since 2004, Mary has steadily worked to establish her relationships with various organisations, their issues, missions, programmes and staff. Her patronages range across areas of culture, the fashion industry, humanitarian aid, support for research and science, social and health patronages and sport. The organisations for which she is patron have reported positive outcomes through their relationship with her and there are various reports in the Danish media and on some of the websites of the organisations themselves about her being quite involved in her working relationship with them. She is currently involved in supporting anti-obesity programs through the World Health Organization, Regional Office for Europe.

In the context of immigrant issues in Denmark, Mary has visited the disadvantaged migrant areas of Vollsmose (2006), Gellerup (2007), and Viborg (2010), and has participated in integration projects including the teaching of the Danish language to refugees. As patron of the Danish Refugee Council, Mary visited Uganda (2008) and East Africa (2011) and supports fundraising for the region.

Mary has played an active role in promoting an anti-bullying program based on an Australian model through the auspices of Denmark's Save the Children. She is also involved in a campaign to raise awareness and safe practices among Danes about skin cancer through The Danish Cancer Society.

Mary is also an Honorary Life Governor of the Victor Chang Cardiac Research Institute based at the Garvan Institute/St Vincent's Hospital, Sydney, a member of the International Committee of Women Leaders for Mental Health and a member of various sporting clubs (riding, golf and yachting). In June 2010, it was announced that Mary has become Patron of UNFPA, the United Nations Population Fund, "to support the agency's work to promote maternal health and safer motherhood in more than 150 developing nations". Mary lends her support to a number of other 'one-off' Danish causes, industry events and international conferences. In 2011, the Westmead Cancer Centre at Westmead Hospital in Sydney was renamed the Crown Princess Mary Cancer Care Centre Westmead.

Mary is an active patron of Denmark's third-highest-earning export industry, the fashion industry, and is Patron of the Copenhagen Fashion Summit.

The Mary Foundation
The foundation's aim is to improve lives compromised by environment, heredity, illness or other circumstances which can isolate or exclude people socially. The initial funds of DKK 1.1 million were collected in Denmark and Greenland and donated to Frederik and Mary as a wedding gift in 2004. Mary is the chairwoman of eight trusts. In 2014, she received a Bambi Award for her work with the foundation.

LGBT rights
In 2016, on the International Day Against Homophobia and Transphobia, Mary gave a speech on LGBT rights at a forum in Copenhagen hosted by the Danish government. She called for an end to discrimination, oppression, and violence against people because of their sexual orientation and gender identity. In January 2018, Mary delivered her speech about LGBTQ+ equality at the Parliamentary Assembly of the Council of Europe. On 25 April 2018, Mary was invited to present the honorary award to LGBT Danmark at the Danish Rainbow Awards – AXGIL 2018. She thus became the first ever member of the royal family to attend the Danish Rainbow Awards. She also attended the awards ceremony in 2019 and 2020. In 2020, Mary spoke at Copenhagen Pride's virtual pride festival.

In October 2019, it was announced that Mary would serve as patron of WorldPride Copenhagen 2021, making her the first ever royal to serve as patron for a major LGBT event. She carried out numerous engagements in connection with the event and also gave the closing speech of the week-long celebrations on 21 August 2021.

Public image and style
Numerous official events were planned for the week of Mary's 50th birthday on 5 February 2022. Several of these, including a gala dinner at Rosenborg Castle, were cancelled due to the ongoing COVID-19 pandemic. However, several hundred Danes showed up at Amalienborg's courtyard at noon on Mary's birthday. Rather than stepping out onto Frederik VIII's Palace's balcony as is customary for birthday celebrations in the Danish royal family, Mary and her three oldest children came out onto the courtyard to thank the people who had shown up. The day after her birthday, the Crown Prince family attended a televised concert held in her honour named Mary 50 – we’re celebrating Denmark's Crown Princess hosted by TV2.

For Mary's 50th birthday, several places in Denmark were named in her honour: The University of Copenhagen created a knowledge centre named the Crown Princess Mary Centre in which Mary will be part of the Advisory Committee; Rigshospitalet, the Copenhagen University Hospital, named their new department for children, teenagers, expecting mothers and their families Mary Elizabeth's Hospital in honour of Mary's extensive work with the well-being of children and youths, maternal health and the hospital's network for children with cancer; and Copenhagen Zoo named the Australia-themed section of their garden Mary's Australian Garden.

Mary has been named one of the world's most fashionable people in Vanity Fair annual International Best-Dressed List and has posed and given interviews for magazines including Vogue Australia (where she used pieces of foreign designers, such as Hugo Boss, Prada, Louis Vuitton or Gaultier, and Danish designers, like Malene Birger and Georg Jensen), Dansk (Danish Magazine, dedicated to Danish fashion) and German Vogue (where she was photographed between pieces of Danish modern art in Amalienborg Palace). Mary also posed for other magazines during her life as a royal, such as The Australian Women's Weekly (to which she spoke on several occasions about her life as a royal and her family), and Parade.

Her elegance was praised by designer Tommy Hilfiger.

Titles, styles, honours and arms

Titles and styles
5 February 1972 – 14 May 2004: Miss Mary Elizabeth Donaldson
14 May 2004 – 29 April 2008: Her Royal Highness The Crown Princess of Denmark
29 April 2008 – present: Her Royal Highness The Crown Princess of Denmark, Countess of Monpezat.

Mary has been Crown Princess of Denmark since her marriage and also Countess of Monpezat by marriage since 29 April 2008, when Queen Margrethe II granted the title to her male-line descendants.

Military ranks

  2008: Officer cadet in the Home Guard
  2009: Sergeant in the Home Guard
  20 February 2009: Lieutenant in the Home Guard
  18 September 2015: First lieutenant in the Home Guard
  31 March 2019: Captain in the Home Guard

Honours

National honours
 : Knight of the Order of the Elephant (R.E.)
 : Dame of the Royal Family Decoration of Queen Margrethe II
 : Recipient of the Homeguard Medal of Merit
 : Recipient of the 75th Birthday Medal of Prince Henrik
 : Recipient of the 350th Anniversary Medal of the Royal Danish Life Guards
 : Recipient of the 70th Birthday Medal of Queen Margrethe II
 : Recipient of the Ruby Jubilee Medal of Queen Margrethe II
 : Recipient of the 75th Birthday Medal of Queen Margrethe II
 : Recipient of the Golden Anniversary Medal of Queen Margrethe II and Prince Henrik
 : Recipient of the Prince Henrik's Commemorative Medal
 : Recipient of the 80th Birthday Medal of Queen Margrethe II
 : Recipient of the Golden Jubilee Medal of Queen Margrethe II

Foreign honours
: 
 Grand Cross of the Order of the Crown
: 
 Grand Cross of the Order of the Southern Cross of Brazil
: 
 1st Class of the Order of the Balkan Mountains 
: 
 Commander Grand Cross of the Order of the White Rose
: 
 Grand Cross of the National Order of Merit
: 
 Grand Cross of the Order of Beneficence
: 
 Grand Cross of the Order of the Falcon
: 
 Sash of the Order of the Aztec Eagle
: 
 Knight Grand Cross of the Order of the Netherlands Lion
Recipient of the King Willem-Alexander Inauguration Medal
: 
 Grand Cross of the Order of Saint Olav
: 
 Member Grand Cross of the Royal Order of the Polar Star
 Recipient of the 70th Birthday Badge Medal of King Carl XVI Gustaf

Arms

With the marriage in 2004, Mary was honoured with the Order of the Elephant, and her father John Dalgleish Donaldson with the Order of the Dannebrog. In accordance with the statutes of the Danish Royal Orders, both Mary and her father were granted a personal coat of arms, this for display in the Chapel of the Royal Orders at Frederiksborg Castle. The main field of Mary's coat of arms is or tinctured and shows a gules MacDonald eagle and a Sable tinctured boat both symbolising her Scottish ancestry. The chief field is azure tinctured and shows two gold Commonwealth Stars from the Coat of arms of Australia, and a gold rose in between, depicted as her personal symbol. Above the shield is placed the heraldic crown of a Crown Prince of Denmark.

The coat of arms of her father is almost identical to that of the Crown Princess, but a gold infinity symbol is depicted (symbolising his career as an Australian mathematician), instead of the gold Rose. Above his shield is instead placed a barred helmet topped with a gules rampant lion, which is turned outward. The lion is derived from the Scottish coat of arms and also from the arms of Tasmania and Hobart. Both coats of arms were approved in 2006 and placed in the Chapel of the Royal Orders in 2007.

References

External links

 

Danish princesses
Crown Princesses of Denmark
Princesses by marriage
People from Hobart
1972 births
Living people
Australian people of Scottish descent
House of Monpezat
Danish people of Australian descent
Naturalised citizens of Denmark
Countesses of Monpezat
Danish people of Scottish descent
Australian expatriates in Denmark
University of Tasmania alumni
Converts to Lutheranism
Danish Lutherans
Australian Lutherans
Former Presbyterians

Grand Crosses of the Order of Beneficence (Greece)
Commanders Grand Cross of the Order of the Polar Star
Knights Grand Cross of the Order of the Falcon
Grand Crosses of the Order of the Crown (Belgium)